Formula Masters China, FMCS (previously known as Formula Pilota China), was a single-seater racing series based in Asia. The series was created in 2011 after the success of the Formula Abarth championship that was created a year before.

Event schedule
Each event in the championship is normally run to a three-day schedule. It comprises two free practice sessions on the first day, one qualifying session and 45–55 km or 25-minute race on the second day, and a 45–55 km or 25-minute race on the third day. The grid for the second race is determined by the fastest lap in the first race; if drivers set equal times, priority will be given to driver who set the time first.

Circuits
Events have been held predominantly on Chinese circuits at Guangdong, Ordos International Circuit, Shanghai, and Shanghai Tianma, as well as Sepang and Kuala Lumpur in Malaysia.

Formula Pilota China Cars
All the teams in Formula Pilota China use the same Tatuus FA010 chassis and a 1.4 litre	FPT engine.

Specifications:

Chassis: Tatuus FA010 Carbon composite monocoque FIA F3-2010 safety homologated 
Dimension: 2650mm x 1490mm x 1455mm
Weight: 525 kg
Engine:	 FPT 414TF
Displacement: 1.400cc
Power output: 180 hp
Fuel: Premier, FIA FT3 fuel cell ethanol compatible
Gearbox: Sadev sequential six-speed gearbox — LSD differential.
Front Suspension: Double wishbone with pushrods
Rear Suspension: Double wishbone with pushrods
Shock Absorbers: ORA
Brake Disc: AP cast iron ventilated discs, 278mm x 16mm.
Wheel Rims: ATS, Front 9x13", Rear 10,5x13"centre-bolt aluminium.
Tyres: GitiCompete GTR1 racing slicks and wet weather tyres
Fuel Tank: 45 litres

Points
After each race the points will be awarded to eligible drivers listed as classified finishers as follows:
2011

Points are awarded after the completion of any Judicial or Technical procedures and after the Stewards have declared the results final. Only the best eleven race results are retained, any other points being discarded.

2012–2013

2014

Results

References

External links
 
 

 
Recurring sporting events established in 2011
Formula racing series
Asian auto racing series
One-make series